New Hampton is a small hamlet in the Town of Wawayanda in Orange County, New York, United States.  It is just outside the city of Middletown, across Interstate 84 along US 6 and NY 17M. It has the ZIP Code 10958.

New Hampton spans from the northern part of Orange County's famous "Black Dirt Region" near Pine Island to route 17M adjoining Middletown, New York.

External links 
Town of Wawayanda Website
Wawayanda Democratic Committee
New Hampton Fire Department

Hamlets in New York (state)
Hamlets in Orange County, New York
Poughkeepsie–Newburgh–Middletown metropolitan area
Wawayanda, New York
U.S. Route 6